Kamil Mazek (born 22 July 1994) is a Polish professional footballer who plays as a midfielder for Chojniczanka Chojnice.

Club career

Dolcan Ząbki
On 20 July 2013 he was loaned from Legia Warsaw to I liga club Dolcan Ząbki. He spent in Ząbki one and a half years and played almost 50 games.

Ruch Chorzów
On 23 January 2015 he signed two and a half years contract with Ekstraklasa side Ruch Chorzów. He debuted in the Ekstraklasa on 18 July 2015.

Zagłębie Lubin
On 28 February 2017 he signed three and a half year contract with Zagłębie Lubin.

Arka Gdynia
On 21 July 2020 he signed a two-year contract with Arka Gdynia.

Career statistics

Club

References

External links
  
 

1994 births
Footballers from Warsaw
Living people
Polish footballers
Poland under-21 international footballers
Association football midfielders
Ząbkovia Ząbki players
Ruch Chorzów players
Zagłębie Lubin players
OKS Stomil Olsztyn players
Arka Gdynia players
Chojniczanka Chojnice players
Ekstraklasa players
I liga players
II liga players